Südbrookmerland is a municipality in the district of Aurich, in Lower Saxony, Germany. It is situated approximately 7 km west of Aurich. Its seat is in the village Victorbur.

References

Towns and villages in East Frisia
Aurich (district)